Kantha also spelled kanta, and qanta, is a type of embroidery craft in the Bangladesh and eastern regions of India, particularly in the Indian states of West Bengal, Tripura and Odisha. In Odisha, old saris are stacked on each other and hand-stitched to make a thin piece of cushion. This is normally used above a bed cushion or instead of a cushion. "Kantha saris" are traditionally worn by women in Bengal region. In these days, embroidery is stitched, popularly known as 'kantha stitched", on sari, kurta (or panjabi) and churidar and many other garments and gaining popularity due to their aesthetic value and handmade characteristics.

Kantha stitching is also used to make simple quilts, commonly known as nakshi kantha. Women in Bengal typically use old saris and cloth and layer them with kantha stitching to make a light blanket, throw, or bedspread, especially for children. Kantha is very popular with tourists visiting the Bengal region of the Indian subcontinent.

Weave

Kantha is a form of embroidery often practised by rural women. The traditional form of Kantha embroidery was done with soft dhotis and saris, with a simple running stitch along the edges. Depending on the use of the finished product they were known as Lepkantha or Sujni Kantha.

The embroidered cloth has many uses including shawls, covers for mirrors, boxes, and pillows. In some cases, the entire cloth is covered with running stitches, employing beautiful motifs of flowers, animals birds and geometrical shapes, as well as themes from everyday activities. The stitching on the cloth gives it a slightly wrinkled, wavy effect. Contemporary kantha is applied to a wider range of garments such as sarees, dupatta, shirts for men and women, bedding and other furnishing fabrics, mostly using cotton and silk. Modern Kantha-stitch craft industry involves a very complex multi-staged production model.

See also
 Embroidery of India
 Nakshi kantha

References

Further reading 
 The Art of Kantha embroidery, by Niaz Zaman. University Press, 1993. .
 
 Kantha: the embroidered quilts of Bengal, by Darielle Mason, Pika Ghosh, Katherine Hacker, Anne Peranteau. Yale University Press, 2010. .
 Kantha, by John Gillow, Pratapaditya Pal, Courtenay McGowen, and Rob Sidner. Mingei International Museum and Radius Books, 2017. .
Kantha Work, by Juby Aleyas Koll. Sarah's Hand Embroidery Tutorials, 2021.

Indian clothing
Embroidery in India
Embroidery stitches
Bengali culture
Bangladeshi clothing
Blankets
Folk art
Bedding
Geographical indications in West Bengal
Culture of West Bengal
Quilting
Arts in Bangladesh
Bangladeshi art
Bangladeshi handicrafts